The Girls' shot put at the 2017 World Youth Championships in Athletics was held on 12 July.

Medalists

Records 
Prior to the competition, the following records were as follows.

Final

References 

2017 IAAF World U18 Championships